Department of Commerce and Business Management is a premier, coeducational, management institute located at Amritsar, Punjab. The Department is located at Maharaja Ranjit Singh Block at Guru Nanak Dev University Campus.

Geographical location 

Department of CBM is a part of Guru Nanak Dev University campus, which is spread over 500 acres (2 km²) near village of Kot Khalsa, some eight kilometer west of the Amritsar City on Amritsar - Lahore highway, next to Khalsa College, Amritsar. The campus presents a picture of modern architecture. Traditional red brick geometrical blocks represent its regard for time-honoured values and commitment to scientific advancement.

Introduction 
The Department of Commere and Business Management (CBM) was initially a constituent unit of the Punjab School of Economics, but in 1984 it started functioning as an independent department. The department offers specialization in Human Resource Management, Marketing Management, Financial Management. The All India Council for Technical Education has recognized CBM as a provider of quality education in management. Each member of the department bears a continuous responsibility to articulate, reinforce and reflect those values that support our highest aspiration. With innovation becoming the key element of the 21st century, CBM has envisioned to become a knowledge creating and applying institution. It aims at developing globally integrated and future oriented managers, capable of functioning in ever changing turbulent environment and pluralistic cross-cultural dimensions.

Faculty 
Guru Nanak Dev University has faculty members who are among the best in the field of management and engineering. Some of them have had a long and successful stint in the corporate world, which is an integral component of their pedagogy. They bring their research into the classroom providing greater depth to the course structure. Their research papers are published in many internationally renowned management journals.

Courses 

Post Graduate Courses
 Master of Business Administration (MBA)
 Master of Business Administration in Financial Services (MBA-FS)
 Master of Business Administration in Human Resource Management (MBA-HRM)
 Master of Commerce (M.Com)
 Master of Philosophy (M. Phil)
 Doctor of Philosophy (Ph.D)

Placements

Partition
In the year 2014, CBM was divided into two separate departments i.e., Department of Commerce and University Business School. In the last three years (2014-2017) several different courses were introduced as a part of UBS (university business school). These are MBA Five Years Integrated, BTTM (Bachelors of tourism and Travel Management), MBA hospital administration. In 2018, the Department of Commerce with introduction of MBA Finance, is renamed as University School of Financial Studies, in its existing  premise.

External links
 Official Website of GNDU
 Website of Commerce & Business Management Dept.(CBM), GNDU 
 GNDU on Google Maps
 university business school website

Commerce colleges in India
Business schools in Punjab, India
University departments in India
Education in Amritsar
Guru Nanak Dev University
Memorials to Guru Nanak